Dejan Antonić (born 22 January 1969) is a Serbian football manager and former player.

He is the father of footballer Stefan Antonić, who has played for Southern in the 2020–21 season.

Early career
He started his professional football playing in local club Red Star Belgrade.
	
In 1987, Antonić was called in the Yugoslavia squad training section, and was able to win a cap. Yugoslavia won the first title that time on final against East Germany through penalty shootout (PSO). And they are remembered as a Yugoslav' "zlatna generacija" (Golden Generation). His well-known team mates were : Robert Jarni, Igor Štimac, Zvonimir Boban, Robert Prosinečki, Predrag Mijatović and Davor Šuker. Later Antonić joined Red Star Belgrade but made no league appearance for them. His debut will be in the 1989–90 Yugoslav First League with FK Spartak Subotica. Next he played with FK Napredak Kruševac in the Yugoslav Second League. In 1995, he left Europe and joined Persebaya FC in Indonesia.

Career in Hong Kong

As a player

Instant-Dict
In 1998–99, Antonić joined Hong Kong First Division club Instant-Dict FC and played more as a defender than a midfielder. His debut was the semi-final match against South China in Hong Kong FA Cup. He was included in Hong Kong XI to compete in 2003 Carlsberg Cup and was elected as a Hong Kong XI as well. Dejan scored a goal by penalty in the match against Denmark national team in Carlsberg Cup. Dejan played very well in the season and was awarded "The Most Fair Player" and being nominated in Hong Kong Footballer Awards several times.
In 2000–01, he assisted Instant-Dict FC to win Hong Kong FA Cup.

Sun Hei
In early 2000, he joined Sun Hei and won three championships, including Hong Kong Senior Challenge Shield, Hong Kong FA Cup and Hong Kong League Cup.

As a coach

Antonić, a UEFA Pro License holder, was appointed by Kitchee as head coach in 2005 and successfully led the team to two trophies in the league on his first year of duty, winning the Hong Kong League Cup and Hong Kong Senior Shield Cup. He led the team to defend their Hong Kong League Cup in 2006, during his second year of duty. He managed Kitchee towards qualification for 2008 AFC Cup.

Achievements with Kitchee FC
 Winner of Hong Kong League Cup 2005-2006
 Winner of the Senior Shield Cup 2005-2006
 Winner of Hong Kong League Cup 2006-2007
 Kitchee went through to Asian Football Championship 2008 qualification
 Elected as Hong Kong "Coach of the Year 2005-2006“
 Won the 2nd Place of Hong Kong League 2006-2007
 Won the 2nd Place of Senior Shield Cup 2007-2008
 Kitchee FC friendly games against:
- Shanghai Shenhua FC (Kitchee was the winner of Canon Cup)
- Hong Kong Selection vs Barcelona FC

He was elected as the 2006 Hong Kong Coach of The Year and also appointed to be a coach of Hong Kong League XI for the annual Carlsberg Cup.

After leaving Kitchee, expansion club TSW Pegasus appointed Antonić as their new Deputy Team Manager & Youth Development.

Antonić has been appointed to coach the Hong Kong National Team as preparation for the 2011 Asian Cup qualifiers. And with Hong Kong National Team, he won the 31st Guangdong Cup 2008. He has been nominated as a consultant of the Hong Kong Law Society Football Team.

Achievements with Hong Kong National Team
 Won the 1st place of Guangdong Cup 2008
 Won the game against India 2-1
 Won the game against Macau 9-1

Antonić left his post as head coach of Tuen Mun in the middle of the 2011–12 Hong Kong First Division League season and joined Arema FC as their manager.
Coaching Arema FC for only 6 months and he was voted by the soccer news website, Goal.com, as "The Best Coach 2011–2012"  of the Indonesian Premier League as he brought Arema FC to go through to the quarter final of AFC Cup 2012 and make the country proud.

Achievements with Arema Indonesia FC
 Won against Kitchee FC in the knockout stage of AFC Cup 2012, and went through to the quarter final round
 Voted as “The Best Coach of Indonesian Premier League 2011-2012”
(http://www.goal.com/id-ID/news/2980/indonesian-premier-league/2012/07/28/3269769/spesial-pelatih-pemain-terbaik-indonesian-premier-league)
 Voted as “The Coach of The Month” (May 2012) by the AFC

After left Arema FC, Antonic was appointed to be head coach of Pro Duta FC and continued shining.

Achievements with Pro Duta FC
 Champion of the Indonesian Premier League 2012-2013
 Champion of the Indonesian Premier League Super Cup 2012-2013
 Voted as “The Coach of the Year” 2012-2013

Finished his contract with Pro Duta FC, Antonic signed a two-year contract with Pelita Bandung Raya on 20 November 2013. On 9 September 2014, he got his contract extended until 2016.

Achievements with Pelita Bandung Raya FC
 Voted as “The Coach of the Month” in February 2014
 Voted as “The Coach of the Month” in August 2014
 Voted as “The Coach of the Month” in October 2014
 Voted as “Coach of the Year”, Indonesian Super League 2014-2015 by PSSI
 Voted as “Coach of the Year”, Indonesian Super League by Goal.com
 Voted as “Coach of the Year”, Indonesian Super League by ESPN
 Pelita Bandung Raya FC was voted as “Team of the Year, Indonesian Super League 2014-2015”
 Pelita Bandung Raya FC won the Runner Up in Bali Island Cup 2014-2015

Antonic joined Persib Bandung FC after he finished his contract with Pelita Bandung Raya.

Achievements with Persib Bandung FC
 Won the 2nd Place of Bhayangkara  Cup 2016

Antonić returned to management on 31 October 2016, signing a 1.5 year contract at South China as manager. The club managed to finish 4th in the league and reached the finals of the 2016-17 Hong Kong FA Cup. Following South China's decision to voluntarily relegate, the contracts of the entire coaching staff were terminated.

On 4 July 2017, Hong Kong Rangers Director Philip Lee announced that Antonić would be the club's new manager.

On 28 March 2018, Borneo announced that Antonić would be the club's new head coach after sacked their previous head coach

After left Borneo FC, Antonic signed with Madura United FC.

Achievements with Madura United FC
 Elected as Best Coach for two weeks in a row

Personal life
Antonić married his Indonesian fiancee, Venna Tikoalu, on 3 July 1999. Venna gave birth to son Stefan on 6 February 2001 in Hong Kong.

Antonić has another older daughter who is living and studying in Serbia.

Games of Hong Kong team coached by Dejan Antonić and Goran Paulić

International games of Hong Kong

Non-international games of Hong Kong

Honours

Player
Sun Hei
 Hong Kong FA Cup: 2002–03
 Hong Kong League Cup: 2002–03

Yugoslavia U-20
 FIFA World Youth Championship: 1987

Manager
Kitchee
 Hong Kong Senior Shield: 2005–06
 Hong Kong League Cup: 2005–06, 2006–07

PSS Sleman
 Menpora Cup third place: 2021

References

External links

 GoalGoalGoal.com
 TSW Pegasus FC Official website
 Kitchee SC Official website
 World Youth Cup Champions Squads 1977–2005
 FIFA.com
 Dejan Antonić at 11v11.com

1968 births
Living people
Serbian footballers
Serbian football managers
Serbian expatriate football managers
Hong Kong international footballers
Red Star Belgrade footballers
FK Spartak Subotica players
FK Napredak Kruševac players
FK Obilić players
Yugoslav First League players
Association football midfielders
Association football defenders
Hong Kong First Division League players
Double Flower FA players
Sun Hei SC players
Hong Kong Rangers FC players
Expatriate footballers in Hong Kong
Expatriate football managers in Hong Kong
Dejan Antonic
Serbia and Montenegro expatriate footballers
Serbia and Montenegro footballers
Yugoslav footballers
Footballers from Belgrade
Serbian expatriate footballers
Expatriate footballers in Indonesia
Serbian expatriate sportspeople in Hong Kong
Serbia and Montenegro expatriate sportspeople in Belgium
Serbia and Montenegro expatriate sportspeople in Indonesia
Serbia and Montenegro expatriate sportspeople in Hong Kong
Serbian expatriate sportspeople in Indonesia
Expatriate football managers in Indonesia
Kitchee SC managers
TSW Pegasus FC managers
Persib Bandung managers
Hong Kong League XI representative players